Jack Duane Laraway (September 20, 1935 – December 3, 2017) was an American football linebacker who played in the American Football League. He is a member of the Pennsylvania Sports Hall of Fame, class of 1997.

Professional career
Laraway played college football at Purdue University and was drafted into the National Football League by the Detroit Lions in the 1959 NFL Draft in the tenth round and as the 112th pick overall. Injured in a 1960 preseason game with the Detroit Lions, he played the 1960 season for the Buffalo Bills of the American Football League, starting 10 games at Left Outside Linebacker. He signed with the Houston Oilers in 1961 helping them to the AFL Championship game in which Houston defeated the San Diego Chargers 10-3. 1962 Linebacker Houston Oilers.  In 1963, Laraway scored the first points in New York Jets team history with a sack of Buffalo Bills QB Jack Kemp for a 2-point safety. 

Laraway wore jersey number 57 with the Buffalo Bills and number 34 with the Houston Oilers. In 1961, with the Houston Oilers, he had 1 interception, returned 30 yards and one kickoff return for 22 yards.

Post football career
Laraway was the physical education instructor and head football coach for the Lee Burneson Junior High School during the 1975 school year in Westlake, Ohio. His son, Ron also played for the team. Jack Laraway was the defensive coordinator for Rocky River High School football team from 1983 to 1985.

References

1935 births
2017 deaths
Sportspeople from Erie, Pennsylvania
Players of American football from Pennsylvania
American football linebackers
Purdue Boilermakers football players
Buffalo Bills players
Houston Oilers players
American Football League players